The Bock 1 is an American high-wing, strut-braced single-seat glider that was designed by John W. Bock of Long Beach, California.

Design and development
Bock started design of the Bock 1 in the mid-1950s, the work taking him many years to complete. His prototype first flew in 1960.

The aircraft is constructed predominantly from aluminium with some surfaces finished with doped aircraft fabric covering. The wing is a constant-chord design with a single strut and end-plates. The  wing employs a NACA 63(3)-618 laminar flow airfoil. The landing gear is a monowheel arrangement.

Only the prototype was ever completed.

Operational history
By 1973 the prototype had flown over 300 hours, including a flight of 7:50 and another flight to  altitude.

In 1983 it was reported that the prototype had not flown in ten years, was permanently stored and required restoration. In May 2011 it was still registered with the Federal Aviation Administration to the designer.

Specifications (Bock 1)

See also

References

1960s United States sailplanes
Aircraft first flown in 1960